The Lower Lake or Chhota Talaab is a lake in Bhopal, the capital of Madhya Pradesh state of India. Along with the Bhojtal or Upper Lake, it forms the Bhoj Wetland.

History 

The lake was built by creating  in 1794 to beautify the city. The construction was commissioned by Chote Khan, a minister of Nawab Hayat Muhammad Khan Bahadur. A number of earlier wells were merged in this lake.
The lower lake is beside a bridge named 'Pul Pukhta'. The lower lake has also been mentioned as "Pukhta-Pul Talao" in literature.

Geography 

The Lower Lake is located to the east of the Upper Lake. An earthen dam separates the two lakes. The two lakes are built in a terraced manner, the lowest level of the Upper Lake is just below the highest level of the Lower Lake.

The Lower Lake has an area (water spread) of 1.29 , and its catchment area is 9.6 km2. The lake receives subsurface seepage from the Upper Lake. In the 1850s, the maximum and minimum depths of the lake were 11.7 m and 6.16 m respectively. As of 2011, the maximum depth was 10.7m.

The Lower Lake does not have any fresh water source; it receives seepage water from the Upper Lake and drainage from 28 sewage-filled nullahs. It drains into the Patra rivulet, which joins Halali River, a small tributary of the Betwa River.

Pollution 

The Lower Lake suffers from pollution due to drainage from sewage-filled nullahs, lack of fresh water source and commercial washing of clothes. The entire lake is eutrophic, and its water is not suitable for drinking.

References

External links
 Lower Lake (Chhota Talab) at wikimapia

Lakes of Madhya Pradesh
Tourist attractions in Bhopal
1794 establishments in India
Geography of Bhopal